Mike Auldridge (December 30, 1938 – December 29, 2012) was an American Dobro player and a founding member of the bluegrass group The Seldom Scene. The New York Times described Auldridge as "one of the most distinctive dobro players in the history of country and bluegrass music while widening its popularity among urban audiences". He also worked as a graphic artist.

Biography
Auldridge was born in Washington, D.C., United States, and grew up in the suburban town of Kensington, Maryland. He attended Wheaton High School and, while in his teens, took classes at the Corcoran College of the Arts and Design. Inspired by his uncle, steel guitarist Ellsworth T. Cozzens who had performed with Jimmie Rodgers during the 1920s, Auldridge started playing guitar at the age of 13. His main influence through his early years was Josh Graves who also sold him his first dobro. A 1967 graduate of The University of Maryland, Auldridge worked as a graphic artist for a commercial art firm in Bethesda, Maryland and then for the now-defunct Washington Star-News. He did not start playing music full-time until the Washington Star-News folded in 1981.

Auldridge last played with Darren Beachley and The Legends of the Potomac bluegrass band. Past bands include The Country Gentlemen, Emerson and Waldron, Cliff Waldron and the New Shades of Grass, Seldom Scene (of which he was a founding member), Chesapeake, The Good Deale Bluegrass Band, and John Starling and Carolina Star (which featured three original members of The Seldom Scene). Auldridge was also a member of the touring bands of Lyle Lovett and Emmylou Harris.

He worked with Paul Beard (Beard Guitars) to produce the Beard Mike Auldridge Models of square-neck resophonic guitars (dobro), including an 8-string version.

Auldridge died on December 29, 2012, one day prior to his 74th birthday, at home under hospice care in Silver Spring, Maryland, after a lengthy battle with prostate cancer.

Awards
Auldridge was nominated for four Grammy awards, including twice for Best Bluegrass Album with The Seldom Scene, in 1992 and 1994. He won numerous awards including Frets Magazine's "Dobro Player of the Year" and the International Bluegrass Music Association's Distinguished Achievement Award. He was a recipient of the 2012 National Heritage Fellowship awarded by the National Endowment for the Arts, which is the United States government's highest honor in the folk and traditional arts.

Discography

References

External links
 
 
 Beard guitars - signature guitar

1938 births
2012 deaths
American country guitarists
American male guitarists
American bluegrass musicians
The Country Gentlemen members
Guitarists from Washington, D.C.
Slide guitarists
University of Maryland, College Park alumni
National Heritage Fellowship winners
20th-century American guitarists
21st-century American guitarists
The Seldom Scene members
Deaths from prostate cancer